The 68th District of the Iowa House of Representatives in the state of Iowa.

Current elected officials
Molly Donahue is the representative currently representing the district.

Past representatives
The district has previously been represented by:
 Clair Strand, 1971–1973
 Jack E. Woods, 1973–1983
 Philip A. Davitt, 1983–1985
 Linda Beatty, 1985–1993
 Michael Cataldo, 1993–2001
 Jack Hatch, 2001–2003
 John Connors, 2003–2005
 Rick Olson, 2005–2013
 Daniel Lundby, 2013–2015
 Ken Rizer, 2015–2019
 Molly Donahue, 2019–present

References

068